(Spanish, 'Church of the Sanctuary' or 'Church of the Shrine') is a Renaissance Catholic church in the city of Quito, capital of Ecuador. It is part of the Metropolitan Cathedral complex, although it seems more like an independent church than an adjoining chapel, both because of its size and because of its importance in Quito's art.

Origin
The origin of the religious dedication of this church is that all of its kind (that is, the churches called by the name of ) are sacramental chapels or sanctuaries of a great cathedral to which they are attached, fulfilling at the same time, and by themselves, the function of parishes of the urban district that surrounds the cathedral. This type of sacramental chapel, really conceived as a temple annexed to a larger one, sharing a façade with the cathedral itself and at the same time having functions as an independent parish, has its origin in the Cathedral of Seville, and from there the model was extended to the cathedrals that the Spanish built in the New World.

History

The construction of this building took place in the period between the 17th and 18th centuries, thanks to the contribution of the Confraternity of the Sagrado Sacramento, which began with the foundation work in 1617. The church was built on an arcade that closed the old Zanguña ravine, adjacent to the cathedral and that extended from the monastery of El Tejar sector to the west of the colonial city, to the area currently known as La Marín; these foundation works were directed by the Jesuit priest of Neapolitan origin, Marcos Guerra, and have a depth of fourteen meters on the south side and three meters on the north side, since they follow the level of decline that the aforementioned ravine presented.

On November 4, 1694, the architect José Jaime Ortiz arrived in Quito, from Alicante (Spain), who signed the contract for the construction of the building, which was planned according to the Italian Renaissance style that was fashionable at the time. The Ecuadorian writer Julio Pazos Barrera describes the temple as follows:

The facade was completed in 1706 by Gabriel de Escorza, while the rest of the construction was completed in 1715, and between 1731 and 1747 the altarpieces inside the temple were finished. The frontispiece was worked under the direction of Gabriel de Escorza Escalante, with the same Neoclassical arrangement that had presided over his work in the Church of San Agustín a few years ago.

Interior decoration
The interior main gate, the work of Bernardo de Legarda, is considered one of the richest manifestations of Quitoan Baroque, which Pazos Barrera describes as "a fabulous wood carving from the beginning of the 18th century. In it, the columns have given way to plant forms that culminate in capricious capitals and cornices. It reproduces, on the interior side, the symbols of the main altar". The central vault, whose dome was decorated with frescoes that reproduce scenes from the Bible, was also commissioned to master Legarda in 1742, who assigned the painter Francisco Albán for that work.

The altarpieces, including the main altar, was made by Bernardo de Legarda and gilded by Cristóbal Gualoto, who was at the head of a team of five officers. Among the smaller altarpieces, the one of  stands out, which has two superimposed bodies with wound columns and niches; while in another of the altarpieces of the  there is a set attributed to the famous Cuenca sculptor .

Gallery

See also
 List of buildings in Quito

References

Roman Catholic churches in Quito
Roman Catholic churches completed in 1715
18th-century Roman Catholic church buildings in Ecuador
Roman Catholic shrines
Renaissance buildings and structures